Sirviö is a Finnish surname. Notable people with the surname include:

 Arto Sirviö (born 1962), Finnish professional ice hockey player
 Sami Sirviö (born 1970), Finnish-born lead guitarist of the Swedish rock band Kent
 Riikka Sirviö (born 1974), Finnish cross-country skier

Finnish-language surnames